Kassandra Jappont (born 24 October 1994) is a Congolese handball player for US Cagnes Handball and the Congolese national team.

She represented Congo at the 2021 World Women's Handball Championship in Spain.

References

1994 births
Living people
Congolese female handball players